The Bakerton Group is an instrumental blues jam band and the side project of the blues rock band Clutch. They incorporate elements of blues rock, psychedelic rock, and jazz.

Biography
The band is currently composed of all four members of the rock band Clutch (Tim Sult, Dan Maines, Jean-Paul Gaster, Neil Fallon) and has toured extensively throughout Canada and the United States. Taking a sidestep from the traditional Clutch sound, The Bakerton Group focuses on the instrumental talents of its members with songs of a psychedelic, groovy, "jazz-infected" feel.

The band's first release came in 2001 with the three-track EP Space Guitars, made available as a free download on the official Clutch website.

In August 2006, the band began recording new material for their first full-length release at the Magpie Cage in Baltimore. J. Robbins of Jawbox fame produced the album, which incorporated a new member, Mick Schauer, to play the Hammond organ. In October 2007, over a year after recording began, the eponymous album was released.

On February 17, 2009, The Bakerton Group released El Rojo. Also produced by Robbins, it is the band's first release on the Weathermaker Music label. After Schauer left the group in 2007, Per Wiberg of Opeth served as replacement on keyboards, organ, and synthesizers.

Discography

Members
 Tim Sult – guitar
 Dan Maines – bass guitar
 Jean-Paul Gaster – drums
 Neil Fallon – guitar

Former members
 Mick Schauer - organ (died 2019)

References

External links
The Bakerton Group on Myspace

Rock music groups from Maryland
Jam bands